Trovo (formerly Madcat) is a Chinese video game live streaming platform owned by Tencent Games. Similarly to Twitch, Trovo features tiered paid subscription options for each channel which gives subscribers customizable rewards. Additionally, it offers the Ace subscription, a site-wide package that includes extra emojis and other advanced features.

References 

Video game streaming services
Tencent divisions and subsidiaries
Software companies of China